The Appalt was involved in the leasing of state revenue, legal monopolies, crown lands, Droit de régale and indirectly charges of any kind in Habsburg Austria during the Baroque period. The Appalt is thus closely related to the financial politics of Mercantilism.

This type of concession was later renewed, later known as the Afterappalt.

The word has an Italian origin, where appalto means 'assignment', 'job posting' and 'concession'.

References 

Early Modern economics
Baroque